Stephen Goldblatt, A.S.C., B.S.C. (born 29 April 1945) is a South African-born British cinematographer, noted for his work on numerous high-profile action films, including the first two entries in the Lethal Weapon series, as well as for his recent collaborations with director Mike Nichols and Tate Taylor.

Early life
Goldblatt was born on 29 April 1945 in Johannesburg, South Africa, to a Jewish family. When he was seven years old, he and his family moved to London, where at the age of 18 he started working as a photojournalist for the London Sunday Times.

Goldblatt attended Guildford School of Art for photography, but later discovered his interest in film while working on a special assignment for Lion Films at Shepperton Studios. It was this interest that motivated him to attend London's Royal College of Art Film School.

Career
Upon graduation, he went to work shooting documentaries and animation, much of it in 16mm. Among his assignments were two Disappearing World episodes for Granada TV.

Goldblatt began his career as a cameraman for documentaries and commercials. From 1972-75, he worked shooting TV commercials for directors such as Hugh Hudson, Alan Parker, Ridley Scott, and Brian Gibson. Goldblatt made the transition to feature films in the mid-1980s, quickly acquiring work with directors Tony Scott on The Hunger (1983), Francis Coppola on The Cotton Club (1984), and Richard Donner on Lethal Weapon (1987) and Lethal Weapon 2 (1989).

In the 1990s, Goldblatt joined the Batman series with director Joel Schumacher and shot Batman Forever (1995) and Batman and Robin (1997). In the late 1990s, during a “film sabbatical” and after many years of only taking snapshots, Goldblatt built a darkroom and began to photograph his life and surroundings again. After his sabbatical Goldblatt worked with directors such as Mike Nichols on Angels in America (2003), Closer (2004) and Charlie Wilson's War (2007), Chris Columbus on Rent (2005) and Percy Jackson & the Olympians: The Lightning Thief (2010), Nora Ephron on Julie & Julia (2009), and most recently Tate Taylor on The Help (2011) and Get on Up (2014).

Stephen Goldblatt now lives in San Miguel de Allende, Mexico and has three grown children. When he is at home, Goldblatt enjoys tending to his pond and koi fish, gardening, playing his guitar, cooking, reading everyday, and mastering the art of husbanding with his wife Deborah.

Photography
One of Stephen Goldblatt's most significant photo shoots was of the British band The Beatles in 1968, who at the time had just finished recording what came to be known as The White Album. The Beatles wanted some fresh publicity photos shot by an unknown photographer, with whom they planned to travel all over London to take random photos. One of Goldblatt's shots became a two-page spread in Life magazine, and a few others were used as album art on Beatles compilations.

Filmography

Film

Television

Awards and nominations
Source:
 1991 Academy Award for Best Cinematography: The Prince of Tides (nomination)
 1991 ASC Award for Outstanding Achievement in Cinematography in Theatrical Releases: The Prince of Tides (nomination)
 1995 Academy Award for Best Cinematography: Batman Forever (nomination)
 1995 ASC Award for Outstanding Achievement in Cinematography in Theatrical Releases: Batman Forever (nomination)
 2001 Primetime Emmy Award for Outstanding Cinematography for a Limited Series or Movie: Conspiracy (nomination)
 2002 Primetime Emmy Award for Outstanding Cinematography for a Limited Series or Movie: Path to War (nomination)
 2003 Primetime Emmy Award for Outstanding Cinematography for a Limited Series or Movie: Angels in America (nomination)
 2003 ASC Award for Outstanding Achievement in Cinematography in Movies of the Week/Pilots: Angels in America (nomination)
 2007 Hollywood Film Award for Cinematography of the Year (nomination)
 2007 Camerimage Lifetime Achievement Award (won)
 2014 Camerimage Golden Frog Award: Get on Up (nomination)

References

External links

1945 births
Alumni of the Royal College of Art
Living people
South African cinematographers
South African film directors